Perilly's cigarettes are a brand of tobacco cigarettes currently selling in Japan, and South Africa. Produced by Rothmans Group. The brand was famous among young Malaysian Men for its low price. Perilly's cigarettes were famous for an advertisement in the 1980s featuring scantily clad women and men enjoying the smoke together that was banned by the country's conservative Muslim government. The box is Black and Gold in colouring.

PERILLY'S was once menaja event sukan sepak takraw in Malaysia until 2002 where the cigarette advertising controversy arose supposedly for another purpose, together with Dunhill menaja 2002 FIFA World Cup for the last time. PERILLY'S also had menaja broadcast PERILLY'S Action Movie on televisyen in Malaysia until around August 2002 before the cigarette tajaan slot was banned.

Sponsorship
 Keris Hitam Bersepuh Emas
 Perilly's action movie.

See also
 Dji Sam Soe 234
 List of programs sponsored by cigarette companies

References 

Cigarette brands